"Big Brother" is the first episode of the BBC sitcom Only Fools and Horses. It is the first episode of series 1, and was first broadcast on 8 September 1981. In the episode, Del buys a consignment of briefcases, only to later discover that the combinations are locked inside.

Synopsis
Derek "Del Boy" Trotter, chairman of Trotters Independent Traders, employs his younger brother Rodney into his company. Later, at their local pub, The Nag's Head, Rodney meets Del's friend Trigger, in order to buy some briefcases. On introduction, Trigger acknowledges to Del that he is already acquainted with his brother Rodney but then immediately calls him "Dave". Del negotiates the price of the briefcases down from £17 to £8, and tries to dupe Trigger by claiming the price for the 25 is £175, when it is actually £200. Rodney, however using his GCE in mathematics as proof of his credibility, proves to Trigger that Del's figures are wrong. It soon emerges that not only were the cases stolen, they are also rejects; the combination for them is locked inside. Rodney advises Del to throw the cases in the river.

Rodney then suggests to Del that he be made the partnership's financial adviser, on the grounds of him having two GCEs (in maths and art). Del, however, is not happy about this due to Rodney's behaviour regarding the briefcases. The row between the brothers is soon made worse by the latter's buying a cheeseburger for Grandad instead of an Emperor burger due to lack of funds. Grandad gets angry with Rodney as well, and Rodney decides to leave the partnership and venture to Hong Kong. He wishes to go there to see a girl, "Shanghai Lil". She was at art college with Rodney but was deported after they were expelled for smoking cannabis, for which Rodney received a £300 fine and a suspended sentence.

The next day, Del trawls London, looking for Rodney and attempting to sell the briefcases, having already previously failed with his telephone contacts. Returning home after having failed to achieve either goal, he is soon joined by Rodney, who only got as far as the Shangri-La doss house in Stoke Newington due to running out of money and forgetting his passport. After they make up, Del informs Rodney that he took his advice and "chucked the bleeding lot in the river", but they floated.

Episode cast

First appearances 

 David Jason as Derek Trotter
 Nicholas Lyndhurst as Rodney Trotter
 Lennard Pearce as Grandad Trotter
 Roger Lloyd-Pack as Trigger

Music 
In the original broadcasts of Only Fools and Horses, the theme tune was one written by Ronnie Hazlehurst. This theme tune was replaced in series 2 with a new tune written and sung by John Sullivan. After the first series completed its original run, all future reruns dropped Hazlehurst's tune, using the John Sullivan version instead to match the other series. The VHS/DVD versions all contain John Sullivan's version of the theme tune, which means recordings with Hazlehurst's theme are now extremely rare. However, Hazlehurst's tune can be heard in this episode, in the scene when Del is attempting to sell the briefcases around the market.

References

External links

1981 British television episodes
Only Fools and Horses (series 1) episodes